Kate Summerscale (born 1965) is an English writer and journalist.

Biography
Summerscale was brought up in Japan, England and Chile. After attending Bedales School (1978–1983), she took a double-first at Oxford University and an MA in journalism from Stanford University. She lives in London with her son.

Writing
She is the author of The Suspicions of Mr Whicher or The Murder at Road Hill House, based on a real-life crime committed by Constance Kent and investigated by Jack Whicher, a book described in Literary Review as an altogether "deft 21st-century piece of cultural detection" which won the Samuel Johnson Prize for Non-Fiction in 2008. Summerscale also wrote the bestselling The Queen of Whale Cay, about Joe Carstairs, "fastest woman on water", which won a Somerset Maugham Award in 1998 and was shortlisted for the 1997 Whitbread Awards for biography. Her book on Whicher inspired the 2011–2014 ITV drama series, The Suspicions of Mr Whicher, written by Helen Edmundson.

She worked for The Independent and from 1995 to 1996 she wrote and edited obituaries for The Daily Telegraph. She also worked as literary editor of The Daily Telegraph. Her articles have appeared in The Guardian, The Daily Telegraph and The Sunday Telegraph.

She has also judged various literary competitions including the Booker Prize in 2001.

Awards and prizes
1997 Whitbread Award (for biography), shortlist, The Queen of Whale Cay
1998 Somerset Maugham Award, winner, The Queen of Whale Cay
2008 Samuel Johnson Prize, winner, The Suspicions of Mr Whicher or The Murder at Road Hill House
2009 Anthony Awards (Best Critical / Non-fiction Work), shortlist, The Suspicions of Mr Whicher or The Murder at Road Hill House
2010 Elected a Fellow of the Royal Society of Literature
2017 Edgar Awards (Best Fact Crime), winner, The Wicked Boy: The Mystery of a Victorian Child Murderer
2020 Baillie Gifford Prize, shortlist, The Haunting of Alma Fielding

Bibliography
The Queen of Whale Cay, Fourth Estate, August 1997
The Suspicions of Mr Whicher or The Murder at Road Hill House, Bloomsbury, April 2008
Mrs Robinson's Disgrace (2012)
The Wicked Boy: The Mystery of a Victorian Child Murderer (29 Apr 2016)
The Haunting of Alma Fielding: A True Ghost Story (2020)
The Book of Phobias and Manias, Profile Books, October 2022

References

External links

1965 births
English writers
Living people
People educated at Bedales School
Alumni of St John's College, Oxford
Fellows of the Royal Society of Literature
English biographers
Women biographers
English women novelists
English women journalists
Edgar Award winners
English women non-fiction writers